Bradley Green may refer to several places in England:

 Bradley Green, Cheshire
 Bradley Green, Gloucestershire
 Bradley Green, Somerset
 Bradley Green, Warwickshire
 Bradley Green, Worcestershire

See also 
Brad Green (disambiguation)